Daibo Dam is a gravity dam located in Yamaguchi prefecture in Japan. The dam is used for flood control. The catchment area of the dam is 15 km2. The dam impounds about 29  ha of land when full and can store 3860 thousand cubic meters of water. The construction of the dam was started on 1969 and completed in 1973.

References

Dams in Yamaguchi Prefecture
1973 establishments in Japan